Trox sibericus is an extinct species of hide beetle in the subfamily Troginae.

References

sibericus
Beetles described in 2007